Zaara is an Indian drama series, that aired from 4 December 2006 to 20 June 2008 on Sahara One.

Plot
The show focuses on Zaara Khan, who at the beginning of the show, is on the verge of tying the knot with her longtime boyfriend and love Samar. But her sister Zeenat approaches her and asks her to become the second wife of her husband Aamir, Zaara's brother-in-law, the reason being Aamir's family's insistence on getting him married a second time due to Zeenat's inability to conceive and give the family an heir. Zeenat wishes only Zaara to become Aamir's second wife for she feels any other girl will take her place in Aamir's life and separate the two of them. Zaara spurns Samar and marries Aamir for her sister's happiness. After some time Zaara and Aamir fall in love with each other, and both Zeenat and Zaara conceive.

However Zeenat's innate insecurity causes her to turn green at the very sight of Zaara and Aamir together. Unable to stand sharing her husband with her sister, Zeenat plots and successfully creates a rift between Zaara and Aamir. She also convinces Aamir that Khushi, Zaara's daughter, is not even his child but someone else's, the fruit of Zaara's unfaithfulness to him. Aamir divorces Zaara and she is thrown out of the house. She then realizes that it was Zeenat who all along created problems for her and ultimately separated her and Aamir, aided and abetted by none other than her first love Samar, who instead of accepting the change in situations gracefully, turned into a jealous and vengeful lover.

Zaara then changes from a simple and straightforward girl to a mature and intelligent woman bent on getting justice for herself and her innocent young daughter. How she manages to outwit and punish Zeenat and Samar form the rest of the story. The court thinks Zaara killed Aamir, and she was sentenced to 10 years in prison. Then, 10 years later, Khushi grew up and Zaara was released from jail, and went back home. Many family members that lived in that house were suddenly disappeared. Zaara falls down the cliff, it was believed that Zaara was dead, but she was not. Zaara soul enters another girl's body. She learns her kids are in danger so she re-enters her home in order to get to save her kids and find the reason behind her death. She soon makes friends with everyone in the house. With the help of Sagar (Khushi's teacher), Zaara makes up a plan to get Zeenat's identity revealed.

Zeenat tries to kill Sagar and gets caught by the entire family. Zaara asks Zeenat why she brought her in the house as Aamir's second wife. Everyone realizes that the women is actually Zaara. Gul, Zeenat's partner in crime, confesses in front of everyone that Zeenat was jealous of Zaara so she gave Zaara a hard time, killed Aamir, and tried to kill Zaara several times. The family also finds out that Zaara gave up her son, Aman, for Zeenat's happiness (Zeenat wanted to give birth to a son) and took in Khushi as her own. Aman goes to Zaara and asks his mother for forgiveness. Zaara hugs Aman and Khushi. Zeenat is taken away by the cops. Gul asks for forgiveness and Zaara forgives her as Gul has repented for her mistakes, Gul turned to a good person. Sagar also proposes to Khushi to marry. The show ends by showing the family as being united and happy.

Cast 
Sameksha as Zaara Khan
Sonia Kapoor as Zaara Khan, replaced Sameksha
 Jatin Garewal as Amir (Zeenat's first husband, Zaara's second husband, father of Aman and Khushi)
 Abhay Vakil as Samar (Zaara's childhood friend)
Malini Kapoor as Zeenat (Zaara's elder sister)
Shagufta Ali as Gul Phuphi
Garima Ajmani as Shirin (Samar's sister)
Zarina Wahab as Amir's mother
Mihir Mishra as Farhan
Uday Nair as Sohaib (Khushi's Friend)
Varun Khandelwal as Aman (Zaara's real son)
 Jaya Binju / Ami Trivedi as Khushi (Zeenat's real daughter)
Amit Dolawat as Sagar (He loves Khushi)
Priya Ahuja as Mehek (Khushi's friend and Aman's wife)
 Iqlaq Khan
  Tarun Khanna
 Kabir Sadanand 
 Nigaar Khan

References

External links 
Official Website

Sahara One original programming
Indian television soap operas
Indian drama television series
2006 Indian television series debuts
2008 Indian television series endings